Hard Skin is an English punk group from Gipsy Hill, London who play in the early UK Oi! style.

History
Hard Skin is an oi band founded in 1996 and their first album Hard Nuts and Hard Cunts appeared that year. The band were: bassist "Fat Bob" (Sean Forbes of Wat Tyler), guitarist and lead vocalist "Johnny Takeaway" (Ben Corrigan of Thatcher On Acid) and drummer "Nosher" (Chris Acland of indie/Britpop band Lush). After Acland's death, he was replaced on drums by "Nipper" (Scott Stewart) for second album Same Meat Different Gravy in 2005, which like its predecessor was received positively in punk and Oi! circles despite (or perhaps partly because of) the band's parodic tendencies.

Third album proper On The Balls was released in 2013, alongside companion album Why Do Birds Suddenly Appear featuring alternate versions of its songs voiced by female vocalists, including Joanna Newsom, Manda Rin, Miki Berenyi, Beth Jeans Houghton, Debbie Smith, Alela Diane, Alison Mosshart, Beki Bondage, Marion Herbain, Roxanne Clifford, and Liela Moss. The album also featured an appearance by Gaye Advert.

Discography

Albums
 Hard Nuts and Hard Cunts, London: Broken Rekids, 1996
 Same Meat Different Gravy, Household Name Records, 2005
 On the Balls, JT Classics, 2013
 Why Do Birds Suddenly Appear, JT Classics, 2013
 Do You Like Hospital Food, (6 song 12" mini album) JT Classics 2014

Compilations and live
 Live & Loud & Skinhead, Damaged Goods Records, 2002
 Where the Fuckin Mic - live at the Grosvenor 2005, Fat Punks Records (HSKIN01), 2009
 We're the Fucking George JT Classics, 2011
 We're the Fucking Business JT Classics, 2015

References

External links 

 2013 interview

Oi! groups
English punk rock groups
Wichita Recordings artists